Larna is one of 54 parish councils in Cangas del Narcea, a municipality within the province and autonomous community of Asturias, in northern Spain. It is located near the core area of the Muniellos Biosphere Reserve.

The population is 78 (2007).

External links
 Official website 

Parishes in Cangas del Narcea